Nineteen ships of the French Navy have borne the name Hercule, in honour of the Roman hero Hercules:
  (1657–1673), a 38-gun ship of the line
  (1642–1672), a 36-gun ship of the line rename Hercule in 1671
  (1673–1678), a 50-gun ship of the line
  (1679–1704), a 30-gun ship of the line
  (1705–1741), a 64-gun ship of the line
  (1750–1760), a 66-gun ship of the line
  (1779), a fluyt
  (1779–1797), a 74-gun
  (1798–1798), a bomb vessel
  (1798), a 
  (1800), a brig
  (1804–1815), a bomb vessel
 Provence (1815–1883), an 80-gun ship of the line, was renamed Hercule in 1815
  (1836–1860), a 100-gun  ship of the line
  (1893–1944), a tugboat
  (1914–1918), an auxiliary minesweeper
  (1939–1944), an auxiliary tugboat of the FNFL
  (1945–1951), a tugboat
  (1960–1993), a tugboat

French Navy ship names